Merichleri is a small town located in the Dimitrovgrad Municipality of Haskovo Province, within South-central Bulgaria.
 
The population of the town was 2,011 residents as of 2006.

Features

Mineral springs
There are mineral springs in the locale, of healing and spa importance since the ancient Thracians.  The mineral water is mainly characterized as moderately mineralized hyper-thermal, and was used in ancient Greek and Thracian natural medicine for treatment of diseases and poisoning. The contemporary natural medicine balneology resort facility is near the town center.

Land art sculpture 
The artist Dan Tenev, created a huge land art sculptural installation in Merichleri, titled Numerical Rows. It was completed in 2010.

See also
Thracian Bulgarians
The Destruction of Thracian Bulgarians in 1913

References

External links

Official Tourism Portal of Bulgaria:  Merichleri — with slideshow & language options.

Towns in Bulgaria
Populated places in Haskovo Province
Spa towns in Bulgaria
Bulgarian art
Land art